The 1990–91 NBA season was the Bulls' 25th season in the National Basketball Association. During the off-season, the Bulls acquired Dennis Hopson from the New Jersey Nets, and signed free agent Cliff Levingston. The Bulls overcame a slow start, losing their first three games of the season, as they later on went on an 11-game winning streak between February and March, held a 32–14 record at the All-Star break, then posted a nine-game winning streak also in March. The Bulls finished in first place in the Eastern Conference with a 61–21 record, surpassing their previous franchise-best from the 1971–72 season. The Bulls had the best team  offensive rating and the seventh best team defensive rating in the NBA.

Michael Jordan averaged 31.5 points, 6.0 rebounds, 5.5 assists and 2.7 steals per game, and won another scoring title and his second Most Valuable Player award, while being named to the All-NBA First Team, NBA All-Defensive First Team, and was selected for the 1991 NBA All-Star Game. Scottie Pippen averaged 17.8 points, 7.3 rebounds, 6.2 assists and 2.4 steals per game, and was named to the NBA All-Defensive Second Team, while Horace Grant provided the team with 12.8 points and 8.4 rebounds per game, and Bill Cartwright contributed 9.6 points and 6.2 rebounds per game. Three-point specialist Craig Hodges won the Three-Point Shootout for the second consecutive year during the All-Star Weekend in Charlotte, and head coach Phil Jackson finished in fourth place in Coach of the Year voting.

In the Eastern Conference First Round of the playoffs, the Bulls swept the New York Knicks in three straight games. Then in the Eastern Conference Semi-finals, they defeated Charles Barkley and the 5th-seeded Philadelphia 76ers in five games. In the Eastern Conference Finals, they swept the defending champion Detroit Pistons in four straight games, and advanced to the NBA Finals for the first time.

After losing Game 1 at home, 93–91 to Magic Johnson and the Los Angeles Lakers, the Bulls would win the 1991 NBA Finals in five games, winning their first ever championship in franchise history. This season was the first of three consecutive NBA titles for the Bulls, as well as marking the beginning of the legendary Bulls dynasty, which would net the team another five more championships over the next seven seasons.

Draft picks

Roster

Regular season

Season standings

Record vs. opponents

Game log

Regular season

|-style="background:#fcc;"
| 1
| November 2, 1990
| Philadelphia
| L 116–124
| Michael Jordan (34)
| Cliff Levingston (6)
| Jordan & Paxson (7)
| Chicago Stadium18,676
| 0–1
|-style="background:#fcc;"
| 2
| November 3, 1990
| @ Washington
| L 102–103
| Michael Jordan (28)
| Michael Jordan (10)
| B. J. Armstrong (4)
| Capital Centre18,756
| 0–2
|-style="background:#fcc;"
| 3
| November 6, 1990
| Boston
| L 108–110
| Michael Jordan (33)
| Cartwright & Jordan (8)
| Michael Jordan (12)
| Chicago Stadium18,676
| 0–3
|-style="background:#cfc;"
| 4
| November 7, 1990
| @ Minnesota
| W 96–91
| Grant & Jordan (17)
| Horace Grant (10)
| Michael Jordan (6)
| Target Center19,006
| 1–3
|-style="background:#cfc;"
| 5
| November 9, 1990
| @ Boston
| W 120–100
| Michael Jordan (41)
| Cliff Levingston (12)
| Scottie Pippen (10)
| Boston Garden14,890
| 2–3
|-style="background:#cfc;"
| 6
| November 10, 1990
| Charlotte
| W 105–86
| Michael Jordan (23)
| Bill Cartwright (7)
| Michael Jordan (8)
| Chicago Stadium18,676
| 3–3
|-style="background:#cfc;"
| 7
| November 13, 1990
| @ Utah
| W 84–82
| Michael Jordan (29)
| Grant & Jordan (11)
| Scottie Pippen (6)
| Salt Palace12,616
| 4–3
|-style="background:#fcc;"
| 8
| November 15, 1990
| @ Golden State
| L 93–103
| Horace Grant (18)
| Scottie Pippen (9)
| Scottie Pippen (7)
| Oakland–Alameda County Coliseum Arena15,025
| 4–4
|-style="background:#cfc;"
| 9
| November 17, 1990
| @ Seattle
| W 116–95
| Michael Jordan (33)
| Scottie Pippen (10)
| Scottie Pippen (6)
| Seattle Center Coliseum14,692
| 5–4
|-style="background:#fcc;"
| 10
| November 18, 1990
| @ Portland
| L 112–125
| Michael Jordan (29)
| Bill Cartwright (8)
| Michael Jordan (7)
| Memorial Coliseum12,884
| 5–5
|-style="background:#fcc;"
| 11
| November 21, 1990
| @ Phoenix
| L 107–109
| Michael Jordan (34)
| Bill Cartwright (12)
| 3 players tied (4)
| Arizona Veterans Memorial Coliseum14,487
| 5–6
|-style="background:#cfc;"
| 12
| November 23, 1990
| @ L.A. Clippers
| W 105–97
| John Paxson (26)
| Scottie Pippen (13)
| Scottie Pippen (12)
| Los Angeles Memorial Sports Arena15,357
| 6–6
|-style="background:#cfc;"
| 13
| November 24, 1990
| @ Denver
| W 151–145
| Michael Jordan (38)
| Bill Cartwright (8)
| Michael Jordan (12)
| McNichols Sports Arena17,022
| 7–6
|-style="background:#cfc;"
| 14
| November 28, 1990
| Washington
| W 118–94
| Michael Jordan (24)
| Bill Cartwright (8)
| Michael Jordan (7)
| Chicago Stadium18,165
| 8–6
|-style="background:#cfc;"
| 15
| November 30, 1990
| Indiana
| W 124–95
| Michael Jordan (37)
| Horace Grant (9)
| Scottie Pippen (15)
| Chicago Stadium18,346
| 9–6

|-style="background:#cfc;"
| 16
| December 1, 1990
| @ Cleveland
| W 120–85
| Michael Jordan (32)
| Bill Cartwright (9)
| Scottie Pippen (13)
| Richfield Coliseum20,273
| 10–6
|-style="background:#cfc;"
| 17
| December 4, 1990
| Phoenix
| W 155–127
| Michael Jordan (27)
| Horace Grant (12)
| Scottie Pippen (11)
| Chicago Stadium18,094
| 11–6
|-style="background:#cfc;"
| 18
| December 7, 1990
| New York
| W 108–98
| Michael Jordan (33)
| Horace Grant (13)
| Michael Jordan (9)
| Chicago Stadium18,676
| 12–6
|-style="background:#fcc;"
| 19
| December 8, 1990
| Portland
| L 101–109
| Michael Jordan (35)
| Scottie Pippen (14)
| John Paxson (11)
| Chicago Stadium18,676
| 12–7
|-style="background:#fcc;"
| 20
| December 11, 1990
| @ Milwaukee
| L 87–99
| Michael Jordan (31)
| Horace Grant (9)
| Michael Jordan (5)
| Bradley Center18,633
| 12–8
|-style="background:#cfc;"
| 21
| December 14, 1990
| L.A. Clippers
| W 128–88
| Scottie Pippen (22)
| Will Perdue (9)
| B. J. Armstrong (9)
| Chicago Stadium17,893
| 13–8
|-style="background:#cfc;"
| 22
| December 15, 1990
| Cleveland
| W 116–98
| Michael Jordan (24)
| Michael Jordan (9)
| Hodges & Jordan (6)
| Chicago Stadium18,228
| 14–8
|-style="background:#cfc;"
| 23
| December 18, 1990
| Miami
| W 112–103
| Michael Jordan (39)
| Michael Jordan (9)
| 3 players tied (6)
| Chicago Stadium17,877
| 15–8
|-style="background:#fcc;"
| 24
| December 19, 1990
| @ Detroit
| L 84–105
| Michael Jordan (33)
| Grant & Pippen (9)
| Michael Jordan (6)
| The Palace of Auburn Hills21,454
| 15–9
|-style="background:#cfc;"
| 25
| December 21, 1990
| L.A. Lakers
| W 114–103
| Michael Jordan (33)
| Michael Jordan (15)
| Jordan & Pippen (9)
| Chicago Stadium18,676
| 16–9
|-style="background:#cfc;"
| 26
| December 22, 1990
| Indiana
| W 128–118
| Michael Jordan (29)
| Cartwright & Pippen (10)
| Scottie Pippen (11)
| Chicago Stadium18,261
| 17–9
|-style="background:#cfc;"
| 27
| December 25, 1990
| Detroit
| W 98–86
| Michael Jordan (37)
| Bill Cartwright (10)
| John Paxson (8)
| Chicago Stadium18,676
| 18–9
|-style="background:#cfc;"
| 28
| December 27, 1990
| Golden State
| W 128–113
| Michael Jordan (42)
| Michael Jordan (14)
| Scottie Pippen (10)
| Chicago Stadium18,676
| 19–9
|-style="background:#cfc;"
| 29
| December 29, 1990
| Seattle
| W 116–91
| Michael Jordan (31)
| Bill Cartwright (13)
| B. J. Armstrong (8)
| Chicago Stadium18,676
| 20–9

|-style="background:#fcc;"
| 30
| January 3, 1991
| @ Houston
| L 92–114
| Michael Jordan (32)
| Horace Grant (12)
| Jordan & Pippen (7)
| The Summit16,611
| 20–10
|-style="background:#cfc;"
| 31
| January 5, 1991
| Cleveland
| W 108–92
| Michael Jordan (30)
| Horace Grant (11)
| B. J. Armstrong (8)
| Chicago Stadium18,676
| 21–10
|-style="background:#cfc;"
| 32
| January 8, 1991
| New Jersey
| W 111–102
| Michael Jordan (41)
| Scottie Pippen (12)
| Scottie Pippen (7)
| Chicago Stadium18,169
| 22–10
|-style="background:#cfc;"
| 33
| January 9, 1991
| @ Philadelphia
| W 107–99
| Michael Jordan (40)
| Horace Grant (10)
| Michael Jordan (9)
| The Spectrum18,168
| 23–10
|-style="background:#cfc;"
| 34
| January 11, 1991
| Atlanta
| W 99–96
| Michael Jordan (31)
| 3 players tied (10)
| Scottie Pippen (9)
| Chicago Stadium18,676
| 24–10
|-style="background:#cfc;"
| 35
| January 12, 1991
| @ Charlotte
| W 106–95
| Michael Jordan (33)
| Cartwright & Grant (11)
| Scottie Pippen (12)
| Charlotte Coliseum23,901
| 25–10
|-style="background:#cfc;"
| 36
| January 14, 1991
| Milwaukee
| W 110–97
| Michael Jordan (34)
| Horace Grant (12)
| Michael Jordan (9)
| Chicago Stadium18,676
| 26–10
|-style="background:#cfc;"
| 37
| January 16, 1991
| @ Orlando
| W 99–88
| Michael Jordan (29)
| Horace Grant (13)
| Armstrong & Jordan (4)
| Orlando Arena15,077
| 27–10
|-style="background:#fcc;"
| 38
| January 18, 1991
| @ Atlanta
| L 105–114
| Michael Jordan (30)
| Horace Grant (10)
| Michael Jordan (8)
| The Omni16,390
| 27–11
|-style="background:#cfc;"
| 39
| January 21, 1991
| @ Miami
| W 117–106
| Michael Jordan (37)
| Horace Grant (10)
| 4 players tied (5)
| Miami Arena15,008
| 28–11
|-style="background:#fcc;"
| 40
| January 23, 1991
| @ New Jersey
| L 95–99
| Michael Jordan (35)
| Horace Grant (11)
| Michael Jordan (5)
| Brendan Byrne Arena18,333
| 28–12
|-style="background:#cfc;"
| 41
| January 25, 1991
| Miami
| W 108–87
| Michael Jordan (26)
| Cliff Levingston (10)
| B. J. Armstrong (6)
| Chicago Stadium18,676
| 29–12
|-style="background:#fcc;"
| 42
| January 31, 1991
| @ San Antonio
| L 102–106
| Michael Jordan (36)
| Horace Grant (16)
| John Paxson (4)
| HemisFair Arena15,908
| 29–13

|-style="background:#cfc;"
| 43
| February 1, 1991
| @ Dallas
| W 101–90
| Michael Jordan (31)
| Scottie Pippen (14)
| Grant & Jordan (8)
| Reunion Arena17,007
| 30–13
|-style="background:#fcc;"
| 44
| February 3, 1991
| @ L.A. Lakers
| L 86–99
| Scottie Pippen (24)
| Will Perdue (11)
| Michael Jordan (9)
| Great Western Forum17,505
| 30–14
|-style="background:#cfc;"
| 45
| February 4, 1991
| @ Sacramento
| W 108–97
| Michael Jordan (24)
| Will Perdue (14)
| Scottie Pippen (8)
| ARCO Arena17,014
| 31–14
|-style="background:#cfc;"
| 46
| February 7, 1991
| @ Detroit
| W 95–93
| Michael Jordan (30)
| Michael Jordan (9)
| 3 players tied (3)
| The Palace of Auburn Hills21,454
| 32–14
|- align="center"
|colspan="9" bgcolor="#bbcaff"|All-Star Break
|- style="background:#cfc;"
|- bgcolor="#bbffbb"
|-style="background:#cfc;"
| 47
| February 12, 1991
| Atlanta
| W 122–113
| Michael Jordan (32)
| Grant & King (6)
| Scottie Pippen (10)
| Chicago Stadium18,545
| 33–14
|-style="background:#cfc;"
| 48
| February 14, 1991
| @ New York
| W 102–92
| Michael Jordan (29)
| Stacey King (9)
| Scottie Pippen (6)
| Madison Square Garden19,081
| 34–14
|-style="background:#cfc;"
| 49
| February 16, 1991
| New Jersey
| W 99–87
| Michael Jordan (26)
| Jordan & Perdue (11)
| Michael Jordan (7)
| Chicago Stadium18,676
| 35–14
|-style="background:#cfc;"
| 50
| February 18, 1991
| @ Cleveland
| W 110–95
| Michael Jordan (32)
| Bill Cartwright (7)
| Scottie Pippen (6)
| Richfield Coliseum20,273
| 36–14
|-style="background:#cfc;"
| 51
| February 19, 1991
| Washington
| W 118–113
| Michael Jordan (40)
| Scottie Pippen (13)
| Scottie Pippen (8)
| Chicago Stadium17,894
| 37–14
|-style="background:#cfc;"
| 52
| February 22, 1991
| Sacramento
| W 129–82
| Michael Jordan (34)
| Scottie Pippen (10)
| Scottie Pippen (9)
| Chicago Stadium18,413
| 38–14
|-style="background:#cfc;"
| 53
| February 23, 1991
| Charlotte
| W 129–108
| Scottie Pippen (43)
| Horace Grant (17)
| Paxson & Pippen (6)
| Chicago Stadium18,676
| 39–14
|-style="background:#cfc;"
| 54
| February 26, 1991
| Boston
| W 129–99
| Michael Jordan (39)
| Jordan & Perdue (8)
| B. J. Armstrong (8)
| Chicago Stadium18,676
| 40–14

|-style="background:#cfc;"
| 55
| March 1, 1991
| Dallas
| W 109–86
| Michael Jordan (29)
| Michael Jordan (11)
| B. J. Armstrong (10)
| Chicago Stadium18,676
| 41–14
|-style="background:#fcc;"
| 56
| March 2, 1991
| @ Indiana
| L 114–135
| Michael Jordan (22)
| Will Perdue (13)
| B. J. Armstrong (5)
| Market Square Arena16,530
| 41–15
|-style="background:#cfc;"
| 57
| March 5, 1991
| Milwaukee
| W 104–86
| Michael Jordan (30)
| Scottie Pippen (10)
| B. J. Armstrong (7)
| Chicago Stadium18,335
| 42–15
|-style="background:#cfc;"
| 58
| March 8, 1991
| Utah
| W 99–89
| Michael Jordan (37)
| Bill Cartwright (9)
| Scottie Pippen (11)
| Chicago Stadium18,676
| 43–15
|-style="background:#cfc;"
| 59
| March 10, 1991
| @ Atlanta
| W 122–87
| Michael Jordan (25)
| Cliff Levingston (10)
| Michael Jordan (9)
| The Omni16,371
| 44–15
|-style="background:#cfc;"
| 60
| March 12, 1991
| Minnesota
| W 131–99
| Grant & Jordan (20)
| Horace Grant (12)
| Michael Jordan (10)
| Chicago Stadium18,268
| 45–15
|-style="background:#cfc;"
| 61
| March 13, 1991
| @ Milwaukee
| W 102–101
| Michael Jordan (39)
| Horace Grant (11)
| Scottie Pippen (6)
| Bradley Center18,633
| 46–15
|-style="background:#cfc;"
| 62
| March 15, 1991
| @ Charlotte
| W 105–92
| Michael Jordan (34)
| Will Perdue (12)
| Michael Jordan (8)
| Charlotte Coliseum23,901
| 47–15
|-style="background:#cfc;"
| 63
| March 16, 1991
| @ Cleveland
| W 102–98
| Michael Jordan (37)
| Horace Grant (9)
| Scottie Pippen (7)
| Richfield Coliseum20,273
| 48–15
|-style="background:#cfc;"
| 64
| March 18, 1991
| Denver
| W 121–108
| Michael Jordan (31)
| Scottie Pippen (11)
| B. J. Armstrong (9)
| Chicago Stadium18,163
| 49–15
|-style="background:#cfc;"
| 65
| March 20, 1991
| Atlanta
| W 129–107
| Michael Jordan (22)
| Horace Grant (10)
| Michael Jordan (11)
| Chicago Stadium18,439
| 50–15
|-style="background:#fcc;"
| 66
| March 22, 1991
| @ Philadelphia
| L 90–95
| Michael Jordan (20)
| Horace Grant (10)
| B. J. Armstrong (7)
| The Spectrum18,168
| 50–16
|-style="background:#cfc;"
| 67
| March 23, 1991
| Indiana
| W 133–119
| Michael Jordan (39)
| Will Perdue (11)
| Scottie Pippen (8)
| Chicago Stadium18,676
| 51–16
|-style="background:#fcc;"
| 68
| March 25, 1991
| Houston
| L 90–100
| Michael Jordan (34)
| Grant & Pippen (12)
| Scottie Pippen (8)
| Chicago Stadium18,676
| 51–17
|-style="background:#cfc;"
| 69
| March 28, 1991
| @ New Jersey
| W 128–94
| Michael Jordan (42)
| Scottie Pippen (14)
| Michael Jordan (4)
| Brendan Byrne Arena20,049
| 52–17
|-style="background:#cfc;"
| 70
| March 29, 1991
| @ Washington
| W 112–94
| Grant & Pippen (22)
| Horace Grant (13)
| Jordan & Pippen (5)
| Capital Centre18,756
| 53–17
|-style="background:#fcc;"
| 71
| March 31, 1991
| @ Boston
| L 132–135 (2OT)
| Michael Jordan (37)
| Horace Grant (18)
| Jordan & Pippen (9)
| Boston Garden14,890
| 53–18

|-style="background:#cfc;"
| 72
| April 2, 1991
| Orlando
| W 106–102
| Michael Jordan (44)
| Horace Grant (7)
| Michael Jordan (6)
| Chicago Stadium18,264
| 54–18
|-style="background:#cfc;"
| 73
| April 4, 1991
| @ New York
| W 101–91
| Michael Jordan (34)
| Scottie Pippen (10)
| Scottie Pippen (12)
| Madison Square Garden19,081
| 55–18
|-style="background:#fcc;"
| 74
| April 5, 1991
| San Antonio
| L 107–110
| Michael Jordan (39)
| Horace Grant (10)
| Michael Jordan (9)
| Chicago Stadium18,676
| 55–19
|-style="background:#fcc;"
| 75
| April 7, 1991
| Philadelphia
| L 111–114 (OT)
| Michael Jordan (41)
| Horace Grant (7)
| Scottie Pippen (9)
| Chicago Stadium18,676
| 55–20
|-style="background:#cfc;"
| 76
| April 9, 1991
| New York
| W 108–106
| Michael Jordan (28)
| Horace Grant (14)
| Michael Jordan (8)
| Chicago Stadium18,676
| 56–20
|-style="background:#cfc;"
| 77
| April 10, 1991
| @ Indiana
| W 101–96
| Michael Jordan (28)
| Horace Grant (7)
| Scottie Pippen (6)
| Market Square Arena16,530
| 57–20
|-style="background:#fcc;"
| 78
| April 12, 1991
| @ Detroit
| L 91–95
| Michael Jordan (40)
| Scottie Pippen (11)
| Scottie Pippen (5)
| The Palace of Auburn Hills21,454
| 57–21
|-style="background:#cfc;"
| 79
| April 15, 1991
| Milwaukee
| W 103–94
| Michael Jordan (46)
| Horace Grant (11)
| Scottie Pippen (6)
| Chicago Stadium18,117
| 58–21
|-style="background:#cfc;"
| 80
| April 17, 1991
| @ Miami
| W 111–101
| Michael Jordan (26)
| Scottie Pippen (11)
| Scottie Pippen (9)
| Miami Arena15,008
| 59–21
|-style="background:#cfc;"
| 81
| April 19, 1991
| @ Charlotte
| W 115–99
| Michael Jordan (41)
| Horace Grant (11)
| Scottie Pippen (8)
| Charlotte Coliseum23,901
| 60–21
|-style="background:#cfc;"
| 82
| April 21, 1991
| Detroit
| W 108–100
| Scottie Pippen (28)
| Will Perdue (10)
| Scottie Pippen (5)
| Chicago Stadium18,678
| 61–21

Playoffs

|- align="center" bgcolor="#ccffcc"
| 1
| April 25, 1991
| New York
| W 126–85
| Michael Jordan (28)
| Horace Grant (8)
| B. J. Armstrong (10)
| Chicago Stadium18,676
| 1–0
|- align="center" bgcolor="#ccffcc"
| 2
| April 28, 1991
| New York
| W 89–79
| Michael Jordan (26)
| Scottie Pippen (8)
| Scottie Pippen (7)
| Chicago Stadium18,676
| 2–0
|- align="center" bgcolor="#ccffcc"
| 3
| April 30, 1991
| @ New York
| W 103–94
| Michael Jordan (33)
| Scottie Pippen (11)
| Michael Jordan (7)
| Madison Square Garden18,021
| 3–0

|- align="center" bgcolor="#ccffcc"
| 1
| May 4, 1991
| Philadelphia
| W 105–92
| Michael Jordan (29)
| Horace Grant (9)
| Scottie Pippen (7)
| Chicago Stadium18,676
| 1–0
|- align="center" bgcolor="#ccffcc"
| 2
| May 6, 1991
| Philadelphia
| W 112–100
| Michael Jordan (29)
| Scottie Pippen (11)
| Michael Jordan (9)
| Chicago Stadium18,676
| 2–0
|- align="center" bgcolor="#ffcccc"
| 3
| May 10, 1991
| @ Philadelphia
| L 97–99
| Michael Jordan (46)
| Scottie Pippen (13)
| Jordan & Pippen (6)
| Spectrum18,168
| 2–1
|- align="center" bgcolor="#ccffcc"
| 4
| May 12, 1991
| @ Philadelphia
| W 101–85
| Michael Jordan (25)
| Horace Grant (11)
| Michael Jordan (12)
| Spectrum17,514
| 3–1
|- align="center" bgcolor="#ccffcc"
| 5
| May 14, 1991
| Philadelphia
| W 100–95
| Michael Jordan (38)
| Michael Jordan (19)
| Michael Jordan (7)
| Chicago Stadium18,676
| 4–1

|- align="center" bgcolor="#ccffcc"
| 1
| May 19, 1991
| Detroit
| W 94–83
| Michael Jordan (22)
| Horace Grant (10)
| three players tied (6)
| Chicago Stadium18,676
| 1–0
|- align="center" bgcolor="#ccffcc"
| 2
| May 21, 1991
| Detroit
| W 105–97
| Michael Jordan (35)
| Scottie Pippen (10)
| Michael Jordan (7)
| Chicago Stadium18,676
| 2–0
|- align="center" bgcolor="#ccffcc"
| 3
| May 25, 1991
| @ Detroit
| W 113–107
| Michael Jordan (33)
| Scottie Pippen (10)
| Michael Jordan (7)
| The Palace of Auburn Hills21,454
| 3–0
|- align="center" bgcolor="#ccffcc"
| 4
| May 27, 1991
| @ Detroit
| W 115–94
| Michael Jordan (29)
| Horace Grant (9)
| Scottie Pippen (10)
| The Palace of Auburn Hills21,454
| 4–0

|- align="center" bgcolor="#ffcccc"
| 1
| June 2, 1991
| L.A. Lakers
| L 91–93
| Michael Jordan (36)
| Horace Grant (10)
| Michael Jordan (12)
| Chicago Stadium18,676
| 0–1
|- align="center" bgcolor="#ccffcc"
| 2
| June 5, 1991
| L.A. Lakers
| W 107–86
| Michael Jordan (33)
| Jordan & Perdue (7)
| Michael Jordan (13)
| Chicago Stadium18,676
| 1–1
|- align="center" bgcolor="#ccffcc"
| 3
| June 7, 1991
| @ L.A. Lakers
| W 104–96 (OT)
| Michael Jordan (29)
| Scottie Pippen (13)
| Michael Jordan (9)
| Great Western Forum17,506
| 2–1
|- align="center" bgcolor="#ccffcc"
| 4
| June 9, 1991
| @ L.A. Lakers
| W 97–82
| Michael Jordan (28)
| Scottie Pippen (9)
| Michael Jordan (13)
| Great Western Forum17,506
| 3–1
|- align="center" bgcolor="#ccffcc"
| 5
| June 12, 1991
| @ L.A. Lakers
| W 108–101
| Scottie Pippen (32)
| Scottie Pippen (13)
| Michael Jordan (10)
| Great Western Forum17,506
| 4–1

Player stats

Regular season

Playoffs

NBA Finals

Game 1
Sunday, June 2, at the Chicago Stadium

Game 2
Wednesday, June 5, at the Chicago Stadium
The Bulls shot a Finals record 61.7% from the floor, with a Jordan layup over Sam Perkins a highlight.

Game 3
Friday, June 7, at the Great Western Forum

Michael Jordan sends Game 3 to overtime with a pull-up jumper with 3.4 seconds to go.

Game 4
Sunday, June 9, at the Great Western Forum

Game 5
Wednesday, June 12, at the Great Western Forum

The Lakers were facing elimination, and the lack of Worthy and Scott was not any help to the Lakers. This would not stop Magic Johnson as Johnson had 20 assists in the game, but it was not enough. Elden Campbell outscored Michael Jordan with 13 points in the first half, but it was not enough. The Lakers still fought and even led 93-90 in the fourth quarter, but a Bulls 9-0 run, and Paxson's 10 points in the final half of the fourth quarter helped secure the Chicago Bulls', and Michael Jordan's first NBA title.

Award winners
 Michael Jordan, All-NBA First Team
 Michael Jordan, NBA Most Valuable Player Award
 Michael Jordan, NBA Finals Most Valuable Player Award
 Michael Jordan, NBA All-Defensive First Team
 Scottie Pippen, NBA All-Defensive Second Team
 Michael Jordan, Regular season leader, Field Goals (990)
 Michael Jordan, Regular season leader, Field Goal Attempts (1837)
 Michael Jordan, Regular season leader, Total Points (2580)
 Michael Jordan, Regular season leader, Scoring Average (31.5 points per game)
 Michael Jordan, Associated Press Athlete of the Year
 Michael Jordan, Sports Illustrated Sportsperson of the Year

NBA All-Star Game
 Michael Jordan, Guard

Transactions

References

 Bulls on Database Basketball
 Bulls on Basketball Reference
 

Chicago Bulls seasons
Chicago Bulls
Eastern Conference (NBA) championship seasons
NBA championship seasons
Chicago
Chicago